Harter Hill is a summit in the Central New York Region of New York. It is located north of Jordanville, New York in the Town of Warren in Herkimer County.

References

Mountains of Herkimer County, New York
Mountains of New York (state)